TVN Style is a Polish-language channel aimed at women featuring the latest in fashion, health and beauty. It was first launched on August 1, 2004 and a part of the TVN network, owned by Warner Bros. Discovery.

Line-up
 Miasto kobiet (City of women) - a daily talk-show about women's issues
 Lekcja stylu (Lesson of Style) - a show about style, how to look and act
 Salon piękności (The Beauty Salon) - a magazineshow about beauty care
 WF (PE) - a gymnastic show
 Zaklinacze wnętrz (The House Doctor)
 Notes Kulinarny (Cooking Note-book) - a cooking show
 Przeglądarka (Browser)
 Co za tydzień (What a Week) - a magazineshow about weekly news (mainly in fashion and movies)
 Telewizja od kuchni (TV. Making of) - a show about working in TV
 Maja w ogrodzie  (Maya in the garden) - a show about gardens, how to make them beautiful, how to create good flower compositions, and how to take care about your garden
 Zielone drzwi (The Green Door)
 Biografie (Biographies) - a show about famous people
 Kto tu rządzi? (Who's the boss now?)
 Ona czyli ja (She or me)
 Mamo już jestem (Mom, I'm here)
 I ty możesz mieć super dziecko (You too can have SuperBaby) - a talkshow for parents how ro take good care for children
 Superniania - a show about woman who comes to desperated parents houses, and helps them take care of very naughty children
 101 powodów dlaczego kochamy lata 90. (101 reasons for why we love the 90s.)
 Przytulaki (Hug Friends) - an animation for children in young age (airing mainly in 6 am)
 Bądź zdrowa (Be healthy) - a show about healthy eating and taking care of your body
 Seks inspektorzy (Sex inspectors)
 Coś więcej, niż cztery ściany (Something more than four walls) - a show about houses, how to make them look good, and buy suitable furniture
 Wiem co jem

Foreign shows 
 Ladette to Lady
 Sex and the City
 Nigella Bites
 Martha Stewart Living
 What Not to Wear
 Trinny & Susannah Undress...
 Hotel Babylon
 Rachel Allen: Bake!
 Downton Abbey
 Hell's Kitchen
 Satisfaction
 What's Good For You
 Angel's Friends
 Trinny & Susannah Undress the Nation

Presenters

Current
 Jolanta Kwaśniewska
 Wojciech Cejrowski
 Klaudia Carlos
 Magda Mołek
 Katarzyna Bosacka
 Anna Maruszeczko
 Dorota Zawadzka
 Karolina Korwin-Piotrowska
 Paulina Smaszcz
 Dorota Wellman
 Joanna Racewicz
 Omenaa Mensah
 Paulina Młynarska
 Weronika Marczuk-Pazura
 Tomasz Kin
 Olga Kuźniak
 Anna Orłowska-Filasiewicz

Previous
 Marzena Rogalska (Current TVP 2)
 Iwona Radziszewska
 Beata Tadla (Current Fakty TVN i TVN24)
 Marta Kuligowska (Current TVN24)
 Sylwia Paszkowska
 Joanna Brodzik
 Karolina Malinowska
 Beata Sadowska (Current TVP2)
 Anna Dziewit
 Katarzyna Montgomery (Current TV 4)
 Joanna Horodyńska (Current VH1 Polska)
 Monika Tarka-Kilen (Current Radio WAWA)

References

External links
 Official Site 

TVN (Polish TV channel)
Television channels and stations established in 2004
Television channels in Poland